T. J. Cook (born September 8, 1982) is a retired American mixed martial artist and boxer. A professional MMA competitor from  2003 until 2017, he fought in Strikeforce.

Mixed martial arts career

Early career
Cook started his career in 2003. He fought only for southeastern US promotions. With a MMA record of 11-3, he signed with Strikeforce.

Strikeforce
Cook made his debut on July 22, 2011, at Strikeforce Challengers: Bowling vs. Voelker replacing an injured Guto Inocente against Lionel Lanham. He won via TKO in the first round.

Cook faced Trevor Smith on November 18, 2011, at Strikeforce Challengers: Britt vs. Sayers. He lost via submission in the first round.

Cook faced Ovince St. Preux on August 18, 2012, at Strikeforce: Rousey vs. Kaufman. He lost via KO in the third round.

Professional boxing
Cook competed twice as a professional Cruiserweight boxer, holding a record of 1-1.

Mixed martial arts record

|-
|-
| Win
| align=center| 13–5
| Ronnie Phillips
| TKO (punches)
| RFC 40: Fireworks
| 
| align=center| 2
| align=center| 2:21
| Tampa, Florida, United States
| 
|-
| Loss
| align=center| 12–5
| Ovince Saint Preux
| KO (punch)
| Strikeforce: Rousey vs. Kaufman
| 
| align=center| 3
| align=center| 0:20
| San Diego, California, United States
| 
|-
| Loss
| align=center| 12–4
| Trevor Smith
| Submission (guillotine choke)
| Strikeforce Challengers: Britt vs. Sayers
| 
| align=center| 1
| align=center| 4:28
| Las Vegas, Nevada, United States
| 
|-
| Win
| align=center| 12–3
| Lionel Lanham
| TKO (punches)
| Strikeforce Challengers: Voelker vs. Bowling III
| 
| align=center| 1
| align=center| 4:59
| Las Vegas, Nevada, United States
| 
|-
| Win
| align=center| 11–3
| Aaron Johnson
| Submission
| PCB MMA: Brawl on the Beach
| 
| align=center| 1
| align=center| 0:22
| Panama City, Florida, United States
| 
|-
| Win
| align=center| 10–3
| Ariel Gandulla
| KO (punches)
| AOF 3: Rumble at Robarts 3
| 
| align=center| 3
| align=center| 1:00
| Sarasota, Florida, United States
|Won the AOF Light Heavyweight Championship.
|-
| Win
| align=center| 9–3
| Scott Harper
| TKO (punches)
| XCF: Rumble in Racetown 1
| 
| align=center| 1
| align=center| 1:37
| Daytona Beach, Florida, United States
| 
|-
| Win
| align=center| 8–3
| Chris Baten
| Decision (unanimous)
| Real Fighting Championships 12: The Comeback
| 
| align=center| 3
| align=center| 5:00
| Tampa, Florida, United States
| 
|-
| Loss
| align=center| 7–3
| George Lockhart
| Submission (rear-naked choke)
| AFL: Eruption
| 
| align=center| 2
| align=center| 3:03
| Lexington, Kentucky, United States
| 
|-
| Loss
| align=center| 7–2
| Emyr Bussade
| Submission (kneebar)
| RIC: Cage Fighting Championships
| 
| align=center| 2
| align=center| 0:40
| Fort Lauderdale, Florida United States
| 
|-
| Win
| align=center| 7–1
| Jason Wells
| TKO (doctor stoppage)
| SR 2: Southern Rage 2
| 
| align=center| 1
| align=center| N/A
| Douglas, Georgia, United States
| 
|-
| Loss
| align=center| 6–1
| Bill Vucick
| Submission (rear-naked choke)
| WEF: World Extreme Fighting
| 
| align=center| 1
| align=center| 4:48
| Florida, United States
| 
|-
| Win
| align=center| 6–0
| Jesse Chilton
| TKO (knee injury)
| CFC 2: Combat Fighting Championship 2
| 
| align=center| 1
| align=center| 2:19
| Orlando, Florida, United States
|Won the vacant CFC Middleweight Championship.
|-
| Win
| align=center| 5–0
| Tony Vartanian
| KO (punches)
| CFC 1: Combat Fighting Championship 1
| 
| align=center| 1
| align=center| 3:34
| Orlando, Florida, United States
| 
|-
| Win
| align=center| 4–0
| Richard Dalton
| TKO (punches)
| FT 3: Full Throttle 3
| 
| align=center| 1
| align=center| 3:03
| Georgia United States
| 
|-
| Win
| align=center| 3–0
| Geno Roderick
| Submission (inverted triangle choke)
| SI: Superfights International
| 
| align=center| 1
| align=center| 2:27
| Lakeland, Florida, United States
| 
|-
| Win
| align=center| 2–0
| Matt Rogers
| KO (strikes)
| OC: Obaktagon Challenge 1
| 
| align=center| 1
| align=center| 0:08
| Jacksonville, Florida, United States
| 
|-
| Win
| align=center| 1–0
| Freddy Ferronni
| TKO (punches)
| WEF: World Extreme Fighting
| 
| align=center| 1
| align=center| 2:28
| Orlando, Florida, United States
|

References

External links

1982 births
Living people
American male mixed martial artists
Light heavyweight mixed martial artists
Mixed martial artists from Florida
Sportspeople from Ocala, Florida
People from Ocala, Florida